Carrigaline is a town and civil parish in County Cork, Ireland, situated on the River Owenabue. The R611 regional road passes through the town, and it is just off the N28 national primary route to Ringaskiddy. Carrigaline grew rapidly in the late 20th century, from a village of a few hundred people into a thriving commuter town although some locals still refer to it as "the village". The town is one of the key gateways to west Cork, especially for those who arrive by ferry from France. Carrigaline is within the Cork South-Central Dáil constituency.

Economy
Carrigaline Pottery, situated in Main Street, closed in 1979, but was subsequently re-opened and run as a co-operative for many years after that. Despite its small size, the village also had a small cinema, owned and run by the Cogan family. Neither the pottery nor the cinema exist today. The Carrigdhoun Weekly newspaper is published in Carrigaline.

The town has four banks and a credit union. There is a long-established Supervalu supermarket, as well as a Dunnes Stores and Lidl. The four-star Carrigaline Court Hotel is located across from the Roman Catholic Church of Our Lady and St John. In addition to retail shops, Main Street has a number of pubs and restaurants. A Dairygold Co-op Superstore is located on Kilmoney Road.

Demographics
As of the 2016 census, Carrigaline had a population of 15,770. Of this population, 83% were white Irish, less than 1% white Irish traveller, 11% other white ethnicities, 2% black, 1% Asian, 1% other, and less than 1% had not stated their ethnicity. In terms of religion the town is 81% Catholic, 8% other stated religion, 11% with no religion, and less than 1% no stated religion.

International relations
Carrigaline has town twinning agreements with the commune of Guidel in Brittany, France, and with the town of Kirchseeon, in Bavaria, Germany.

Transport
Carrigaline is served a number of Bus Éireann bus routes. These include route 220 (Ovens via Ballincollig, Cork City and Douglas), 220X (Ovens via Cork City onwards to Fountainstown and Crosshaven), 225 (Cork Kent railway station via Cork City and Cork Airport onwards to Haulbowline), and 225L (Carrigaline Industrial Estate via Ringaskiddy to Haulbowline).

Culture

Sport 
Local sporting organisations include association football (soccer) clubs Avondale United FC and Carrigaline United A.F.C., Gaelic Athletic Association club Carrigaline GAA, rugby union club Carrigaline RFC, and other tennis, badminton, basketball, golf, and martial arts clubs.

Religion 
Carrigaline's Roman Catholic church, the church of 'Our Lady and John', was built in 1957. The local Baptist church was founded in 1987. The Church of Ireland (Anglican) church, St Mary's church, dates to 1824.

Notable people
 Francis Hodder (1906–1943), first-class cricketer, rugby union player and Royal Air Force officer
 Aaron Drinan (b.1998), association footballer
 Nicholas Murphy (b.1978), former Gaelic footballer
 Simon Coveney (b.1972), former Tánaiste and current Minister for Foreign Affairs has a constituency office in Carrigaline

See also

 Carrigaline railway station (1903–1932)
 Carrigaline Farmhouse Cheese

References

Towns and villages in County Cork
Civil parishes of County Cork